Desulfosporomusa is a genus of sulfate-reducing bacteria. So far there is only one species of this genus known (Desulfosporomusa polytropa).

References

External links

 Desulfosporomusa at NCBI

Peptococcaceae
Bacteria genera
Monotypic bacteria genera